Passionism is a contemporary art movement in Scandinavia, anti-avantgarde in its approach. The term was coined by art critique Merete Sanderhoff in her work Sorte Billeder [Black Pictures]  as an attempt to categorise talents outside the avantgarde canon, that did not fit into any known art category. They are referred to as the black sheep of the contemporary art scene.

The passionist artists are concerned with the continuation of pre-avantgarde painting traditions without turning into a repetition of these works. They are not simply postmodernists because they actually take the content and the techniques of these traditional paintings seriously. The content focuses on narratives of riddles, yearning, and solemnity. That does not mean they lack humour, but their paintings are meant to be taken seriously. There is a tendency to create very dark paintings hence the title black pictures. Furthermore, they often comment on the doctrines of the modern and postmodern art and art theories, moving beyond these rigid constraints.

References 
Merete Sanderhoff (2007): Sorte Billeder – kunst og kanon. Rævens Sorte Bibliotek.
Merete Sanderhoff (2006): This is not a canon. Canonization and its effect on contemporary art. In Nordisk Museologi 2006/1. pp. 74–88.

Notes 

Contemporary art movements